Events in the year 1637 in the Spanish Netherlands and Prince-bishopric of Liège (predecessor states of modern Belgium).

Incumbents

Habsburg Netherlands
Monarch – Philip IV, King of Spain and Duke of Brabant, of Luxembourg, etc.

Governor General – Cardinal-Infante Ferdinand of Austria

Prince-Bishopric of Liège
Prince-Bishop – Ferdinand of Bavaria

Events
April
 16 April – Assassination of Sébastien de La Ruelle, former mayor of Liège, triggers anti-Spanish rioting.

July
 21 July – Dutch forces besiege Breda.
 26 July – French forces commanded by Cardinal de La Valette take Landrecies.

August
 7 August – Merchants of London formally protest seizure of English tobacco shipments to Holland.
 25 August – Venlo retaken.

September
 3 September – Roermond retaken.

October
 7 October – Breda lost.

Publications
 Erycius Puteanus, De Bissexto (Leuven, Cornelius Coenestenius and Georgius Lipsius), available on Google Books.
 Arnold de la Porte, Compendio de la lengua española. Institutie vande Spaensche tale (Antwerp, Caesar Joachim Trognaesius), dedicated to Johannes Chrysostomus vander Sterre. Available on Google Books

Works of art
 Peter Paul Rubens – The Origin of the Milky Way, now in the Museo del Prado, Madrid

Births
January

June
 27 June – Alexander Voet the Younger, print maker (died 1693/1705)

September
 14 September – Renier Meganck, painter (died 1690)

Deaths
Date uncertain

March
 12 March – Cornelius a Lapide (born 1567), Jesuit exegete

April
 16 April – Sébastien de La Ruelle, mayor of Liège
 17 April – René de Renesse, 1st Count of Warfusée (born c. 1580), conspirator

June
 6 June – Pieter Huyssens (born 1577), Jesuit architect

July
 12 July – Willem van Haecht (born 1593), painter

September
 14 September
 Joannes Cnobbaert (born 1590), bookseller and printmaker
 Theodoor Rombouts (born 1597), painter

November
 23 November – Carlos Coloma (born 1566), former commander in the Army of Flanders

References